Chris Pollard is an American baseball coach and former pitcher, who is the current head baseball coach of the Duke Blue Devils. He played college baseball at Davidson for head coach Dick Cooke from 1993 to 1996 before playing professionally in 1996. He then served as the head coach of the Pfeiffer Falcons (2000–2004) and Appalachian State Mountaineers.

Playing career
Pollard is from Amherst County, Virginia, and attended high school at Virginia Episcopal School and college at Davidson College and played for the Wildcats baseball team for four years.  He pitched in the competitive Southern Conference, and ranks third all-time at Davidson in wins.  He also ranks highly in the Davidson record books for strikeouts, appearances, starts, innings pitched, complete games and shutouts.  As a sophomore, he earned wins over #1 ranked Georgia Tech and #25 ranked .  He also earned the win in both games of a double header against  as a junior.  After graduating in 1996, Pollard played in the independent Western League and Northern League before beginning his coaching career.

Coaching career
Pollard began his coaching career as an assistant at Davidson.  After one season, he became head coach at Division II member Pfeiffer, which he rebuilt over five seasons.  In his final season, the Falcons set a school record for wins with a record of 41–14 and their second consecutive Carolinas-Virginia Athletic Conference championship.  Pollard was named conference Coach of the Year, and was also rewarded with the head coaching position at Appalachian State, a Southern Conference rival of his alma mater Davidson.  Pollard spent eight seasons with the Mountaineers, claiming the school's first conference championship since 1987 in his final 2012 campaign.  ASU's at-large trip to the 2012 NCAA Tournament ended just one win shy of a Super Regional.  Pollard was named head coach at Duke shortly after the end of the tournament run.

Head coaching record
Below are tables of Pollard's yearly records as an NCAA and collegiate summer baseball head coach.

NCAA

Collegiate summer baseball

Coastal Plain League

See also
List of current NCAA Division I baseball coaches

References

Living people
Davidson Wildcats baseball players
Mississippi State University alumni
Davidson Wildcats baseball coaches
Pfeiffer Falcons baseball coaches
Appalachian State Mountaineers baseball coaches
Duke Blue Devils baseball coaches
Place of birth missing (living people)
1970s births
People from Amherst County, Virginia
Sioux Falls Canaries players
Salinas Peppers players